Mary Michael Nagu (born 11 May 1952) is a Tanzanian CCM politician and Member of Parliament for Hanang constituency since 2005. She is the former Minister of State in the Prime Minister's Office for Investment and Empowerment.

Nagu served as Minister of Justice and Constitution Affairs from 2006 to 2008.

References

1952 births
Living people
Chama Cha Mapinduzi MPs
Female justice ministers
Government ministers of Tanzania
Kilakala Secondary School alumni
Tanzanian MPs 2010–2015
Tanzanian MPs 2015–2020
University of Dar es Salaam alumni
Weruweru Secondary School alumni